Behar Berisha (born 20 September 1991 in Lugano) is a Swiss footballer of Albanian descent who most recently played for Teuta Durrës in the Albanian Superliga.

References

1991 births
Living people
Sportspeople from Lugano
Swiss people of Albanian descent
Kosovo Albanians
Association football midfielders
Swiss men's footballers
Kosovan footballers
GC Biaschesi players
KF Teuta Durrës players
Kategoria Superiore players
Swiss expatriate footballers
Kosovan expatriate footballers
Expatriate footballers in Albania
Kosovan expatriate sportspeople in Albania
Swiss expatriate sportspeople in Albania